Modern Man in Search of a Soul is a book of psychological essays written by Swiss psychologist Carl Jung.

Background
In the years preceding this publication, Jung had experienced several dramatic shifts. After the Bugishu Psychological Expedition through East Africa with George Beckwith, H. G. Baynes, and Ruth Bailey, Jung returned to Zurich and focused on the lecture format of his English seminars at the Psychological Club - eventually attracting a new group of international followers. In addition to expanding his academic following, Jung's psychiatric practice also rapidly grew taking on notable patients like Mary Foote and Thornton Wilder. During this period in Zurich, Jung struck up a friendship with Wolfgang Ernst Pauli.

In the translators' preface Cary F. Baynes provides some background to the material: 

Jung's various presentations to the Psychological Club in Zurich in this period, notably his 1932 seminar on Kundalini yoga, have been widely regarded as a milestone in the psychological understanding of Eastern thought. Kundalini yoga presented Jung with a model for the development of higher consciousness, and he interpreted its symbols in terms of the process of individuation.

Summary
The writing covers a broad array of subjects such as gnosticism, theosophy, Eastern philosophy, and spirituality in general.
The first part of the book deals with
dream analysis in its practical application, the problems and aims of modern psychotherapy, and also his own theory of psychological types. The middle section addresses Jung's beliefs about the stages of life and Archaic man. He also contrasts his own theories with those of Sigmund Freud.

In the latter parts of the book, Jung discusses 
psychology and literature and devotes a chapter to basic postulates of analytical psychology.
The last two chapters are devoted to the
spiritual problem of modern man in aftermath of World War I. He compares it to the flowering of gnosticism in the 2nd century C.E. and investigates how psychotherapists are like clergy.

References

External links
Cambridge Philosophy Journal –  brief 1939 review of Modern Man in Search of a Soul

1933 non-fiction books
Philosophy of religion literature
Works by Carl Jung